Ashley Anne Schaus (born June 8, 1988) is an American soccer player from Aliso Viejo, California. She is a midfielder for the Women's Professional Soccer club FC Gold Pride and the United States U-23 women's national soccer team.

Career

Professional career
Bowyer, an NSCAA All-American at Ohio State University, was selected by FC Gold Pride in the fifth round of the 2010 WPS Draft.

Personal life
Bowyer is a native of Aliso Viejo, California.

References

External links
FC Gold Pride player profile
Ohio State player page
US Soccer player profile

1988 births
Living people
American women's soccer players
Soccer players from California
FC Gold Pride players
Pali Blues players
Ohio State Buckeyes women's soccer players
USL W-League (1995–2015) players
Women's association football midfielders